The Roman Catholic Diocese of Luçon (Latin: Dioecesis Lucionensis; French: Diocèse de Luçon) is a diocese of the Latin Church of the Roman Catholic Church in France. Its see is Luçon Cathedral in the commune of Luçon. The diocese comprises the department of Vendée. Created in 1317 out of the diocese of Poitiers, its existence was interrupted during the French Revolution, but it was restored in 1821, along with the Bourbon restoration.

History

The monastery of Luçon was founded in 682 by Ansoald, Bishop of Poitiers, who placed it under the government of St. Philibert (616-684). The monk, having been expelled from Jumièges, established the monastery of the Black Benedictines on the Isle of Her (Noirmoutiers) around 674, of which Luçon was at first a dependency, probably as a priory. The monastery of Luçon was burned to the ground by the Northmen in May 853, and was still in ruins in 877. The list of the abbots of Notre Dame de Luçon begins about the middle of the eleventh century.

In 1317, Pope John XXII engaged in a major restructuring of the episcopal organization of southern and western France, both in territory governed by the King of France and territory governed by the King of England. On 13 August 1317, in the Bull Sane Considerantes, he divided the diocese of Poitiers, creating the new dioceses of Luçon and Maillezais. His stated reason was the large size of the diocese of Poitiers and its large population, which made it difficult for only one bishop to provide all the spiritual services needed. The Abbot of Luçon, Pierre de La Veyrie (Vereya), was named the first bishop of Luçon. He was consecrated in Avignon on 20 November 1317 by Cardinal Berengarius Fredoli, Bishop of Porto.

During the administration of Bishop Elias Martineau (1421–1424), trouble came to the diocese of Luçon in the person of Georges de la Trémoille (1385–1446), the future favorite of King Charles VII. Tremoille owned a fief in the neighborhood, the barony of Mareuil-sur-le-Lay, which, in his own mind, gave him preeminence among all the seigneurs in the area. The Bishop of Luçon owned the fortress in the town of Luçon, which Tremoille wanted and which he took by military force, dispossessing the bishop's castellan; he did the same at Moutiers-sur-le-Lay, also a property of the bishops of Luçon. He then began to levy taxes on the vassals of Luçon. He continued to hold these properties illegally and by force into the reign of the next bishop, Guillaume de Goyon, who finally appealed directly to the King, who on 16 November 1424 ordered his seneschals to restore the Bishop to his full possession and rights. This did not stop Tremoille in his harassment. In 1436 Bishop Fleury had to apply to Parlement for an arrêt against him, which repeated the King's orders to his seneschals. Tremoille replied by building a fortress of his own on land owned by the bishop at Le Moulin du Puy-du-Fou, in which he placed a garrison led by one of his bastard sons.

After the death of Tremoille in 1446, Bishop Nicolas Coeur (1442–1451) was able to obtain from the King the grant of the right to hold two fairs at Moutiers-sur-le-Lay, one for the Monday after Ascension day (April or early May) and the other on the Tuesday after All Saints Day (November 1). This brought increased economic activity to the area, and profits for the bishop.

It was Bishop Milon d'Illiers (1527–1552) who purchased the barony of Luçon from Anne de Laval. The barony was held from the Count of Poitou, who was the King of France. The bishops thus became Seigneurs de Luçon, and a direct vassal of the King.

In 1516 King Francis I signed at treaty with Pope Leo X, which has come to be called the Concordat of Bologna, in which the King and his successors acquired the right to nominate each and every one of the bishops in France, except those of the dioceses of Metz, Toul and Verdun. This of course interfered with the traditional rights of the cathedral Chapters to elect their bishop, and from time to time Chapters would attempt to conduct a free election despite the king's nomination. When the king was an heretic or excommunicate, the problems were especially serious.

Cathedral and Chapter

On the same day he ordered that the churches of the Benedictine monasteries in the towns of Luçon and Maillezais should become the cathedrals of the new dioceses, in perpetuam. In Luçon the church was dedicated to the Virgin Mary, and the monks of the monastery provided the clergy of the Chapter of the cathedral, down to 1468.

In 1468 the Chapter of the cathedral was "secularized', by a bull of Pope Paul II; that is, the monks no longer provided the officials and members of the Chapter, but instead the Chapter was reorganized as a college of secular canons. The Pope also provided the college of canons with a set of statutes. The dignities (not dignitaries) of the Chapter were: the Dean, the Archdeacon-Major, the Archdeacon of Aziana, the Archdeacon of Alperia, the Cantor, the Provost, the Treasurer, the Chancellor, the Subdeacon and the Succentor. There were thirty full prebends and seven semi-prebends. In 1672 there were twelve dignities and thirty Canons.

On 30 December 1637, by letters patent, King Louis XIII granted the members of the Chapter of Luçon exemption from the obligation to quarter troops of the king in times of emergency and to have their property and goods seized.

All Cathedral Chapters were dissolved by order of the National Constituent Assembly in 1790, and their property and incomes directed to "the good of the people".

There was also a collegiate church in the diocese, at Montaigu, founded in 1438 (or 1356) and dedicated to Saint Maurice. It was presided over by a Dean, elected by the Canons, and confirmed by the bishop. There was also a Cantor, Subcantor, a Sacristan, and three Canons.

Revolution

The diocese of Luçon was abolished during the French Revolution by the Legislative Assembly, under the Civil Constitution of the Clergy (1790). Its territory was subsumed into the new diocese, called 'Vendée', which was part of the Metropolitanate called the 'Métropole du Sud-Ouest'. The Civil Constitution mandated that bishops be elected by the citizens of each 'département', which immediately raised the most severe canonical questions, since the electors did not need to be Catholics and the approval of the Pope was not only not required, but actually forbidden. Erection of new dioceses and transfer of bishops, moreover, was not canonically in the competence of civil authorities or of the Church in France. The result was schism between the 'Constitutional Church' and the Roman Catholic Church.  The legitimate bishop of Luçon, Marie-Charles-Isidore de Mercy, refused to take the oath, and therefore the episcopal seat was declared vacant. He was in fact one of the thirty bishops who subscribed to the Exposition des principes, sur la Constitution civile du Clergé (30 October 1790).

On 27 February 1791 the electors of 'Vendée' were assembled at Fontenay. Of the 478 electors, only 173 appeared. Next day 77 of them elected Jean-Sylvain Servant, the Vicar General of Angers. He immediately received a letter from Bishop de Mercy, and on 30 March he resigned. A second election was held, with only 99 electors present, and on 1 May the Oratorian priest François Auguste Rodrigue, the prior-curé of Fougère, was elected. He was consecrated at Notre-Dame de Paris on 29 May 1791 by Constitutional Bishop Jean-Baptiste Gobel. He resigned in 1793, in time to avoid the anti-revolutionary rising of the Vendée and the retaliation of the Terror, and obtained a post in the civil administration. He had no successor in the Constitutional church.

During the Vendée, three engagements took place at or near Luçon, the final battle taking place on 14 August 1793. In each, the troops of the Republic were successful.

Once the Concordat of 1801 with First Consul N. Bonaparte went into effect, Pius VII was able to issue the appropriate bulls to restore many of the dioceses and to regulate their boundaries, most of which corresponded closely to the new 'départements'.  The Bull Qui Christi Domini abolished all the dioceses of France, and recreated most of the dioceses of the Ancien Régime. The diocese of Luçon was not one of them. The diocese of Luçon was suppressed by the Concordat of 1801 and annexed to the Diocese of La Rochelle; its bishop, from 1804 to 1821 was Msgr. Gabriel-Laurent Pailloux.

Revival
The diocese of Luçon was reestablished in principle in the Concordat of 11 June 1817, but difficulties between the King, his Legislative Assembly (which refused to ratify the Concordat), and the Pope, postponed the implementation until 1821.
The Diocese of Luçon thereafter comprised the territory of the ancient diocese (minus a few parishes incorporated in the Diocese of Nantes); and almost all the former Diocese of Maillezais, which was permanently suppressed.

In 1856 the diocese of Luçon became involved in an international scandal. The bishop of Luçon, Jacques-Marie-Joseph Baillès, had been appointed in 1845 by the government of King Louis-Philippe. The bishop was a firm royalist, as well as an ultramontanist, and an active enforcer of the decrees of the Council of Trent. In 1848 the Minister of Public Instruction, M. Marie-Louis Pierre Felix Esquirou de Parieu, had appointed to a teaching position in the collège in Luçon a Jewish professor. Bishop Baillès protested loudly against anyone who at any time could entrust the education of young Christians to an Israelite. In 1852 he had published a pastoral letter supporting the Index of Prohibited Books, which was a challenge to the opinions of, among others, Senator Gustave Rouland, the incoming Minister of Public Instruction and Cults. The French government demanded the removal of Bishop Baillès by the Pope, and Pius IX, who was maintained on his throne in Rome only with the support of French troops, had no alternative but to do as requested, and he demanded the resignation of the bishop.  Baillès resigned on 21 February 1856, and made his way to Rome; his successor was nominated by the government on 5 March. On 11 March 1856, in his capacity as a Senator, Rouland gave a speech in favor of Gallicanism and against the Index, emphasizing the policies of which Baillès was such a vocal critic. The bishop was offered a titular archbishopric by the Pope, but he preferred to call himself ancien évêque de Luçon. He was appointed to the Congregation of the Index in the Roman Curia, and in 1866 continued his feud by publishing a book in defense of the Congregation of the Index. He died in exile on 17 November 1873.

Bishops

1317 to 1500

 1317–1334: Petrus (or Pierre) I. de La Veyrie
 1334–1353: Renaud de Thouars
 1354: Jean Jofevri
 1354: Gualterus
 1354–1359: Guy (Guido)
 1359–1387: Guillaume de La Rochefoucauld
 1388–1407: Etienne Loypelli
 1407–1408: Martin Goyon
 1408–1418: Germain Paillard
 1421–1424: Elias Martineau (Martinelli)
 1424–1431: Guillaume de Goyon
 1431–1441: Jean Fleury, O.Cist.
 1442–1451: Nicolas Coeur
 1451–1461: André de La Roche
 1461–1490: Nicolas Boutault
 1491–1494: Mathurin de Dercé
 1496–1514: Pierre de Sacierges

from 1500 to 1800

 1515–1523: Ladislaus Dufau
 1523–1524: Jean de Lorraine-Guise
 1524–1527: Cardinal Louis de Bourbon
 1527–1552: Milon d'Illiers
 1553–1562: René de Daillon du Lude
 1562–1573: Jean-Baptiste Tiercelin
 1578–1584: René de Salla
 1586–1592: Jacques Duplessis-Richelieu 
 1595–1600: François Yver
 Alphonse-Louis du Plessis de Richelieu
 1606–1623: Armand-Jean du Plessis de Richelieu
 1624–1635: Aimeric de Bragelone
 1637–1660: Pierre Nivelle, O.Cist.
 1661–1671 Nicolas Colbert
 1672–1699: Henri de Barillon
 1699–1723: Jean-François de Valderies de Lescure
 1723–1736: Michel-Roger de Bussin–Rabutin
 1738–1758: Samuel-Guillaume de Verthamon de Chavagnac
 1759–1775: Claude-Jacquemet Gautier
 1775–1801: Marie-Charles-Isidore de Mercy, (17 Nov 1775 – 24 Oct 1801)

since 1800
René-François Soyer (24 September 1821 – 5 May 1845)
Jacques-Marie-Joseph Baillès (24 November 1845 – 21 Feb 1856 Resigned)
François-Augustin Delamare (16 June 1856 – 18 March 1861)
Charles-Théodore Colet (22 July 1861 – 21 December 1874)
Jules François Lecoq (15 March 1875 – 20 August 1877)
Clovis-Nicolas-Joseph Catteau (21 September 1877 – 28 Nov 1915)
Gustave-Lazare Garnier (27 May 1916 Appointed – 30 Jan 1940 Died) 
Antoine-Marie Cazaux (11 Oct 1941 Appointed – 4 Jul 1967 Resigned) 
Charles-Auguste-Marie Paty † (4 Jul 1967 – 25 Mar 1991 Retired) 
François Charles Garnier (25 Mar 1991 – 7 Dec 2000 Appointed, Archbishop of Cambrai) 
Michel Santier (19 Jun 2001 – 4 Sep 2007 Appointed, Bishop of Créteil) 
Alain Castet (14 Apr 2008 – 12 October 2017)
François Joseph Marie Jacolin, M.D.P. (29 May 2018 – )

See also
Catholic Church in France

References

Bibliography

Reference books

  p. 315. (in Latin)
 pp. 181–182.
 p. 230.
 p. 225.
 
 p. 267.

Studies

External links
 Annuaire du diocèse de Luçon (2017) 
Diocese of Luçon - catholic-hierarchy.org

Acknowledgment

Roman Catholic dioceses in France
1317 establishments in Europe
1310s establishments in France